Zhang Xia (born 21 June 1975) is a Chinese gymnast. She competed in six events at the 1992 Summer Olympics. At the 1990 Goodwill games in Seattle, she won the gold medal on uneven bars along with a bronze medal with her team.

References

1975 births
Living people
Chinese female artistic gymnasts
Olympic gymnasts of China
Gymnasts at the 1992 Summer Olympics
Goodwill Games medalists in gymnastics
Competitors at the 1990 Goodwill Games